Carl Wilson is a Canadian music critic who has written for many publications including The Globe and Mail and, as of 2022, Slate. He started the Zoilus blog. He is most well known for his book Let's Talk About Love: A Journey to the End of Taste. It was published in Continuum's 33⅓ series. Though set up as a critique of Celine Dion's album Let's Talk About Love, Wilson attempts to critique himself and music criticism in general. In 2014, an expanded version of Let's Talk About Love was released, featuring essays by, among others, James Franco, Mary Gaitskill, Nick Hornby, and Krist Novoselic.

See also
 Poptimism

Notes

Living people
Canadian music critics
Canadian columnists
The Globe and Mail people
Year of birth missing (living people)